Brian Bailey is a Toronto, Ontario, Canada based fashion designer.  He designs for women and has bridal and evening collections in addition to day-wear and ready-to-wear, sportswear and plus sizes.

Career
Bailey started out in the fashion business in Toronto. In 1988 he took part in Toronto Fashion Week.

In April, 2007, Bailey went on the Shopping Channel and sold $80,000 of designer clothing in one day. Also 2007, Brian Bailey acted as the 'mentor' to young fashion designers in the reality television competition Project Runway Canada. He remained on the show for its second season.

By 2009, Bailey's fashions were being sold at Saks and Harrods.

References

External links
 Brian Bailey - website

Further reading
"Brian Bailey". The Canadian Encyclopedia.

Living people
Canadian fashion designers
People from Toronto
Year of birth missing (living people)